The 1945–46 Oberliga  was the inaugural season of the Oberliga, the first tier of the football league system in Allied-occupied Germany. The league operated in seven regional divisions, Berlin (four divisions), South and Southwest. For the second consecutive season no German championship was held. The competition would resume in 1948 with 1. FC Nürnberg taking out the first post-war championship.

In the British and Soviet occupation zone no Oberligas were organised. In the former the Oberliga Nord and Oberliga West commenced play in the 1947–48 season while, in the Soviet zone, the DDR-Oberliga was organised from 1949 onwards.

In the French occupation zone the Oberliga Südwest operated only in the north with the southern division established in the following season.

In the American occupation zone, with the approval of the US occupation authorities, the Oberliga Süd kicked off on 4 November 1945.

In post-Second World War Germany many clubs were forced to change their names or merge. This policy was particularly strongly enforced in the Soviet and French occupation zones but much more relaxed in the British and US one. In most cases clubs eventually reverted to their original names, especially after the formation of the Federal Republic of Germany in 1949.

Oberliga Berlin
The 1945–46 season was the inaugural season of the league. The league champions of each division advanced to the championship round. At the end of the season the league was reduced from four divisions of nine teams each to a single division with twelve clubs.

Group A

Group B

Group C

Group D

Championship

Oberliga Südwest
The 1945–46 season was the inaugural season of the league.

Northern group

Southern group
The southern division of the Oberliga Südwest commenced in 1946–47. In the 1945–46 season regional leagues were played with a final to determine which club would play the northern division winner in the French occupation zone championship:

|}

Final
The French occupation zone championship was decided in a set of finals between the northern and southern champions:

|}

Oberliga Süd
The 1945–46 season was the inaugural season of the league. No team was relegated at the end of season as the league was expanded to 20 teams.

German championship
For the second consecutive season, no German championship was held. The competition would resume the following season.

References

Sources
 30 Jahre Bundesliga  30th anniversary special, publisher: kicker Sportmagazin, published: 1993
 kicker-Almanach 1990  Yearbook of German football, publisher: kicker Sportmagazin, published: 1989, 
 DSFS Liga-Chronik seit 1945  publisher: DSFS, published: 2005
 100 Jahre Süddeutscher Fußball-Verband  100 Years of the Southern German Football Federation, publisher: SFV, published: 1997

External links
 The Oberligas on Fussballdaten.de 

1945-46
1
Ger